Yin Jianling (born October 1971）is a Chinese writer of children's literature. She is senior editor of the Shanghai newspaper Xinmin wanbao.

Education 
Born in Shanghai in October 1971, Yin has a BA from the Law and Politics Department, at Huadong Normal University, and an MA from the Chinese Literature Department at Shanghai Normal University.

Writing career 
Yin was eighteen when her poetry was published in Youth Literature and Art《少年文艺》. She has continued to write and publish poetry, essays, novels, and reportage, and opinions. She was the editor-in-chief of a woman’s magazine, and is now senior editor of the Shanghai newspaper Xinmin wanbao. She became a member of the China Writers Association in 1998, and has a key role in the Shanghai Writers Association. She is particularly well known for her writing for children, in particular for adolescent girls.

Awards 
Yin has won numerous awards for her books, including the prestigious Chen Bochui Awards for Children's Literature.
 2014 - Winner of a Chen Bochui Children's Literature Award - for The Sound of Fireflies
 2013 - Nominated for an Astrid Lindgren Memorial Award (ALMA)
 2011 - Winner of a Chen Bochui Children's Literature Award - for 1937 - Autumn in the Summer of Youth
 2007 - Winner of a Chen Bochui Children's Literature  - for To Future You - 15 Letters for a Girl

Selected publications 
[The translated titles are approximate]
 1995 -《盛开的心情》[Bright Mood] - poetry
 1996 -《纯真季节》[Pure Seasons] - essays
 1997 -《玻璃鸟》[Glass Bird] - autobiographical novel (prize-winning)
 2000 -《纸人》[Paper Figure] - novel (prize-winning)
 2000 -《月亮茶馆里的童年》[Childhood in the Moonlight Teahouse] - novel (prizewinning)
 2001 -《临界情感》[Critical Emotion] - women's essays 
 2002 -《热点女人》[Focus on Women] - creative non-fiction
 2003 -《轮子上的麦小麦》[Mai Xiaomai on the Wheel] - novel
 2004 -《记得那年花下》[Remembering that year beneath the flowers] - essays
 2004 -《米兰公寓》[Milan Apartments] - novella
 2004 -《殷健灵少女物语》[Yin Jianling's Stories about Girls] (3 vols)
 2004 -《爱情无耻》[Love Without Shame] - essays
 2005/06 -《风中之樱》[Cherries in the Wind] (4 vols) - fantasy novel
 2006 -《听见萤火虫》[The Sound of Fireflies] - essays 安徽少年儿童出版社 
 2007 -《一滴秘密的眼泪》[A Secret Teardrop] - novellas
 2007 -《遇见从前》[Meeting the Past]
 2008 -《蜻蜓，蜻蜓》[Dragonfly, Dragonfly] (prize-winning)
 2008 -《一定找到你》[Definitely Found You] - essays for children中国福利会出版社
 2008 -《靠近你，靠近我》[Close to You, Close to Me] - collected works
 2008 -《画框里的猫·出逃》[Cat in the Picture Frame: Fleeing] - short stories (prize-winning)
 2009 -《1937·少年夏之秋》[1937 - Autumn of the Summer of Youth] (prize-winning)
 2009 -《凯蒂的幸福时光》[The Happiness of Kati] - translation of Jane Vejjajiva's novel 
 2009 -《纯情游走》[Innocent Walk] - collection
 2010 -《你的小船你的帆》[Your Boat, Your Sail] - novellas
 2011 -《殷健灵作品精选》[The Best of Yin Jianling] - collection
 2011 -《轮子上的麦小麦》[Mai Xiaomai on the wheel] - novella
 2011 -《风中之樱》[Cherry in the Wind] (2 vols) - fantasy novel (new edition)
 2011 -《零度情感》[Zero Degree Feelings] - essays
 2011 -《画框里的猫》[Cat in the Picture Frame),《夏日和声》[Summer Harmony] - in Swedish
 2011 -《掌心里的蓝月亮》[Blue Moon in the Palm of My Hand]
 2011 -《看时间流过》[Watching Time Pass By] (with Tang Yunhui 唐云辉）
 2012 -《一定找到你》[Definitely Found You]
 2012 -《俯瞰天堂——米开朗基罗艺术与人生的“昼夜晨暮”》[A Bird's Eye View of Paradise: Michelangelo's art and "Morning and Evening" of life]
 2012 -《殷健灵获奖作品集美绘版》 [Yin Jianling's Prize-winning Works]:《纸人》[Paper Person],《听见萤火虫》[The Sound of Fireflies],《画框里的猫》[Cat in the Picture Frame]
 2012 -《幸运的坏男孩》[The Lucky Bad Boy] - translation of novel
 2012 -《你可听见沙漏的声音》[You Can Hear The Sand in the Hourglass] - essay (prize-winning) 获首届《儿童文学》金近奖
 2012 -《和夏天约会》[Summer Meeting] - poetry
 2013 -《甜美小镇》[Beautiful Town]
 2013 -《薄荷糖》[Mint Sweets] - short stories
 2013 -《纯真记事簿》[Notebook of Innocence] - series of stories
 2013 -《致未来的你——给女孩的十五封信》[For the Future You - 15 Letters for Girls] - letters/essays
 2013 -《莲花般的女孩》[Lotus Girl]
 2013 -《安安的蜻蜓》[An-An's Dragonfly]
 2016 -《野蛮坡》[Yemangpo] - novel
 2021 - The Visible Sounds - picture book, illustrated by Yu Rong, tr. Filip Selucky (UClan Publishing) ISBN 9781912979790

References

External links

Yin Jianling - interview in Shanghai Daily, 8 Dec 2013

Living people
1971 births
Chinese children's writers
Chinese women children's writers
Chen Bochui Children's Literature Award winners
East China Normal University alumni
Shanghai Normal University alumni
Writers from Shanghai